The term "marketing mix" is a foundation model for businesses, historically centered around product, price, place, and promotion (also known as the "4 Ps"). The marketing mix has been defined as the "set of marketing tools that the firm uses to pursue its marketing objectives in the target market".

Marketing theory emerged in the early twenty-first century. The contemporary marketing mix which has become the dominant framework for marketing management decisions was first published in 1984. In services marketing, an extended marketing mix is used, typically comprising 7 Ps ( product, price, promotion, place, packaging, positioning and people), made up of the original 4 Ps extended by process, people and physical evidence. Occasionally service marketers will refer to 8 Ps (product, price, place, promotion, people, positioning, packaging, and performance), comprising these 7 Ps plus performance.

In the 1990s, the model of 4 Cs was introduced as a more customer-driven replacement of the 4 Ps.
There are two theories based on 4 Cs: Lauterborn's 4 Cs (consumer, cost, convenience, and communication), and Shimizu's 4 Cs (commodity, cost, channel, and communication).

Given the valuation of customers towards potential product attributes (in any category, e.g. product, promotion, etc.), and the attributes of the products sold by other companies, the problem of selecting the attributes of a product to maximize the number of customers preferring it is a computationally intractable problem.

The correct arrangement of marketing mix by enterprise marketing managers plays an important role in the success of a company's marketing:
 develop strengths and avoid weaknesses
 strengthen the competitiveness and adaptability of enterprises
 ensure the internal departments of the enterprise work closely together

Emergence and growth 

The origins of the 4 Ps can be traced to the late 1940s. The first known mention of a mix has been attributed to a Professor of Marketing at Harvard University, Prof. James Culliton. In 1948, Culliton published an article entitled, The Management of Marketing Costs in which Culliton describes marketers as 'mixers of ingredients'. Some years later, Culliton's colleague, Professor Neil Borden, published a retrospective article detailing the early history of the marketing mix in which he claims that he was inspired by Culliton's idea of 'mixers', and credits himself with popularising the concept of the 'marketing mix'. According to Borden's account, he used the term, 'marketing mix' consistently from the late 1940s. For instance, he is known to have used the term 'marketing mix' in his presidential address given to the American Marketing Association in 1953.

Although the idea of marketers as 'mixers of ingredients' caught on, marketers could not reach any real consensus about what elements should be included in the mix until the 1960s.  The 4 Ps, in its modern form, was first proposed in 1960 by E. Jerome McCarthy; who presented them within a managerial approach that covered analysis, consumer behavior, market research, market segmentation, and planning. Phillip Kotler, popularised this approach and helped spread the 4 Ps model. McCarthy's 4 Ps have been widely adopted by both marketing academics and practitioners.

The prospect of extending the marketing mix first took hold at the inaugural AMA Conference dedicated to Services Marketing in the early 1980s, and built on earlier theoretical works pointing to many important limitations of the 4 Ps model. Taken collectively, the papers presented at that conference indicate that service marketers were thinking about a revision to the general marketing mix based on an understanding that services were fundamentally different from products, and therefore required different tools and strategies. In 1981, Booms and Bitner proposed a model of 7 Ps, comprising the original 4 Ps extended by process, people and physical evidence, as being more applicable for services marketing.

Since then, there have been a number of different proposals for a service marketing mix (with various numbers of Ps); most notably the 8 Ps, comprising the 7 Ps above, extended by 'performance'.

McCarthy's 4 Ps 

The original marketing mix, or 4 Ps, as originally proposed by marketer and academic Philip Kotler & E. Jerome McCarthy, provides a framework for marketing decision-making. McCarthy's marketing mix has since become one of the most enduring and widely accepted frameworks in marketing.

Table 1: Brief Outline of 4 Ps

Product refers to what the business offers for sale and may include products or services. Product decisions include the "quality, features, benefits, style, design, branding, packaging, services, warranties, guarantees, life cycles, investments and returns".

Price refers to decisions surrounding "list pricing, discount pricing, special offer pricing, credit payment or credit terms". Price refers to the total cost to customer to acquire the product, and may involve both monetary and psychological costs such as the time and effort spent in acquisition. Distribution channels are taken into consideration that includes retailer, wholesaler, Business to Business or Business to Customer .

Place is defined as the "direct or indirect channels to market, geographical distribution, territorial coverage, retail outlet, market location, catalogues, inventory, logistics, and order fulfillment". Place refers either to the physical location where a business carries out business or the distribution channels used to reach markets.  Place may refer to a retail outlet, but increasingly refers to virtual stores such as "a mail order catalogue, a telephone call centre or a website. Example, firms that produce luxury goods like Louis Vuitton employ an intensive placement strategy by making their products available at only a few exclusive retailers. In contrast, lower priced consumer goods like toothpaste and shampoo, typically employ an extensive placement strategy by making their products available to as many different retailers as possible."

Promotion refers to "the marketing communication used to make the offer known to potential customers and persuade them to investigate it further". Promotion elements include "advertising, public relations, direct selling and sales promotions."

Modified and expanded marketing mix: "Seven P's" 

By the 1980s, a number of theorists were calling for an expanded and modified framework that would be more useful to service marketers. The prospect of expanding or modifying the marketing mix for services was a core discussion topic at the inaugural AMA Conference dedicated to Services Marketing in the early 1980s, and built on earlier theoretical works pointing to many important problems and limitations of the 4 Ps model. Taken collectively, the papers presented at that conference indicate that service marketers were thinking about a revision to the general marketing mix based on an understanding that services were fundamentally different from products, and therefore required different tools and strategies. In 1981, Booms and Bitner proposed a model of 7 Ps, comprising the original 4 Ps plus process, people and physical evidence, as being more applicable for services marketing.

Table 2: Outline of the Modified and Expanded Marketing Mix

People are essential in the marketing of any product or service. Personnel stand for the service. In the professional, financial, or hospitality service industry, people are not producers, but rather the products themselves. When people are the product, they impact public perception of an organization as much as any tangible consumer goods.  From a marketing management perspective, it is important to ensure that employees represent the company in alignment with broader messaging strategies. This is easier to ensure when people feel as though they have been treated fairly and earn wages sufficient to support their daily lives.

Process refers to a "set of activities that results in delivery of the product benefits". A process could be a sequential order of tasks that an employee undertakes as a part of their job. It can represent sequential steps taken by a number of various employees while attempting to complete a task. Some people are responsible for managing multiple processes at once. For example, a restaurant manager should monitor the performance of employees, ensuring that processes are followed. They are also expected to supervise while customers are promptly greeted, seated, fed, and led out so that the next customer can begin this process.

Physical evidence refers to the non-human elements of the service encounter, including equipment, furniture and facilities. It may also refer to the more abstract components of the environment in which the service encounter occurs including interior design, colour schemes and layout. Some aspects of physical evidence provide lasting proof that the service has occurred, such as souvenirs, mementos, invoices and other livery of artifacts.  According to Booms and Bitner's framework, the physical evidence is "the service delivered and any tangible goods that facilitate the performance and communication of the service". Physical evidence is important to customers because the tangible goods are evidence that the seller has (or has not) provided what the customer was expecting.

Lauterborn's 4 Cs (1990)

Robert F. Lauterborn proposed a 4 Cs classification in 1990. His classification is a more consumer-orientated version of the 4 Ps that attempts to better fit the movement from mass marketing to niche marketing:

Shimizu's 4 Cs: in the 7Cs Compass Model
After Koichi Shimizu proposed a 4 Cs classification in 1973, it was expanded to the 7Cs Compass Model to provide a more complete picture of the nature of marketing in 1979. The 7Cs Compass Model is a framework of co-marketing (commensal marketing or Symbiotic marketing). Also the Co-creative marketing of a company and consumers are contained in the co-marketing. Co-marketing (collaborate marketing) is a marketing practice where two companies cooperate with separate distribution channels, sometimes including profit sharing. It is frequently confused with co-promotion. Also commensal (symbiotic) marketing is a marketing on which both corporation and a corporation, a corporation and a consumer, country and a country, human and nature can live.

The 7Cs Compass Model comprises:
(C1) Corporation – The core of 4 Cs is corporation (company and non profit organization). C-O-S (competitor, organization, stakeholder) within the corporation. The company has to think of compliance and accountability as important. The competition in the areas in which the company competes with other firms in its industry.

The 4 elements in the 7Cs Compass Model are:

A formal approach to this customer-focused marketing mix is known as 4 Cs (commodity, cost, channel, communication) in the 7 Cs Compass Model. The 4 Cs model provides a demand/customer centric version alternative to the well-known 4 Ps supply side model (product, price, place, promotion) of marketing management.
Product → Commodity
Price → Cost
Place	→ Channel
Promotion → Communication

The compass of consumers and circumstances (environment) are:
(C6) Consumer – (Needle of compass to consumer)
The factors related to consumers can be explained by the first character of four directions marked on the compass model. These can be remembered by the cardinal directions, hence the name compass model:
N = Needs
S = Security
E = Education: (consumer education)
W = Wants

(C7) Circumstances – (Needle of compass to circumstances )
In addition to the consumer, there are various uncontrollable external environmental factors encircling the companies. Here it can also be explained by the first character of the four directions marked on the compass model:
N = National and International (Political, legal and ethical) environment
S = Social and cultural
E = Economic
W = Weather (Extreme weather)

These can also be remembered by the cardinal directions marked on a compass. The 7 Cs Compass Model is a framework in co-marketing (symbiotic marketing).
It has been criticized for being little more than the 4 Ps with different points of emphasis. In particular, the 7 Cs inclusion of consumers in the marketing mix is criticized, since they are a target of marketing, while the other elements of the marketing mix are tactics. The 7 Cs also include numerous strategies for product development, distribution, and pricing, while assuming that consumers want two-way communications with companies.

An alternative approach has been suggested in a book called Service 7''' by Australian Author, Peter Bowman. Bowman suggests a values based approach to service marketing activities. Bowman suggests implementing seven service marketing principles which include value, business development, reputation, customer service and service design. Service 7 has been widely distributed within Australia.

Digital Marketing MixDigital marketing mix is fundamentally the same as Marketing Mix, which is an adaptation of Product, Price, Place and Promotion into digital marketing aspect. Digital marketing can be commonly explained as 'Achieving marketing objectives through applying digital technologies'.ProductThanks to the interaction and connection of the Internet, Product has been redefined as 'virtual product' in the digital marketing aspect, which is regarded as the combination of tangibility and intangibility. Through the form of digital, a product can be directly sent from manufacturers to customers. For example, customers could buy music in the form of an MP3 rather than buy it in the form of a physical CD. As a result, when a company is making strategy for Internet marketing, it is necessary to understand how to vary their products in the online environment. Here are some indications of adapt the product element on the Internet.

 Modifying the core product: In this case, it particularly refers to the products that can be remodeled into digital forms including movies, music, books and other publishing etc. Take Netflix as an example. The wide use of Internet has changed its form of products from selling and renting DVDs through retail stores into selling and renting video online.
 Providing digital products: In order to gain market shares in the Internet, companies need to widen its product range. For example, a psychological counseling could offer online consultation via video calls. 
 Building the whole product: Apart from selling products online, Amazon.com also provides a paid subscription service called Amazon Prime, with which customers could enjoy free delivery and videos on Amazon.
 Conducting online research: The Internet offers a low-cost and convenient way of making marketing researches, which is helpful for companies to find out what products or services do customers prefer.PricePrice concerns about the pricing policies or pricing models from a company. Due to the wide use of the Internet, many applications could be found in both consumer's and producer's perspective. From consumers' side, the Internet enables people to make a comparison to real-time prices before they make a consumption decision, which is time-saving and effort-saving for the consumers. As for the suppliers, they can adjust prices in the real-time and provide higher degree of price transparency with customers. Besides, the Internet is more likely to ease the pressure on price because online-producers do not have to put budget on renting a physical store. Hence, making new or adjusting pricing strategies is essential for the company that wants to enter the Internet market.

Pricing strategies and tactics see also: PricingPlaceWith the application of the Internet, place is playing an increasingly important role in promoting consumption since the Internet and the physical channels become virtual. The major contribution from the Internet to the business is not only making it possible to selling products online, but also enabling companies to build relationships with customers. Furthermore, since the convenience of navigating from one site to another, place from the digital marketing perspective is always linked with promotion, which means retailers often use third-party websites such as Google search engine to guide customers to visit their websites.PromotionPromotion refers to selecting the target markets, locating and integrating various communication tools in the marketing mix. Unlike the traditional marketing communication tools, tools in digital marketing aim at engaging audiences by putting advertisements and content on the social media, including display ads, pay-per-click (PPC), search engine optimisation (SEO), influencers etc. When creating online marketing campaigns, Chaffey and Smith suggested that they can be separated into six groups:

 Search marketing, including search engine optimisation(SEO), pay-per-click(PPC).
 Online PR, encouraging positive comments about one's products or services while reducing negative comments.
 Online partnerships, building relationships between third-party webs to promote products or services.
 Interactive advertising 
 Opt-in e-mail advertising
 Social media marketing, starting and participating in customer to customer, customer to company interaction through social media.

 The Internet Mix 
The Internet Mix''', was first proposed by Sidney (Sid) Peimer in a 2004 article in Bizcommunity, where he identified the Internet Mix as consisting of three elements:

 Sell (trade)
 Tell (inform)
 Dwell (entertain)

Difficulty of computational methods

Automatically selecting the attributes of a product (in any category, i.e. product, promotion, etc.) to maximize the number of customers preferring the resulting product is a computationally intractable  problem. Given some customer profiles (i.e., customers sharing some features such as e.g. gender, age, income, etc.), the valuations they give to each potential product attribute (e.g. females aged 35–45 give a 3 out of 5 valuation to "it is green"; males aged 25–35 give 4/5 to "it can be paid in installments"; etc.), the attributes of the products sold by the other producers, and the attributes each producer can give to its products, the problem of deciding the attributes of our product to maximize the number of customers who will prefer it is Poly-APX-complete. This implies that, under the standard computational assumption, no efficient algorithm can guarantee that the ratio between the number of customers preferring the product returned by the algorithm and the number of customers that would prefer the actual optimal product will always reach some constant, for any constant. Moreover, the problem of finding a strategy such that, for any strategy of the other producers, our product will always reach some minimum average number of customers over some period of time is an EXPTIME-complete problem, meaning that it cannot be efficiently solved. However, heuristic (sub-optimal) solutions to these problems can be found by means of genetic algorithms, particle swarm optimization methods, or minimax algorithms.

See also
Advertising
Co-creation
Co-marketing
E. Jerome McCarthy
Marketing

References

Further reading
 
 
 
Four P's, Four C's And The Consumer Revolution

External links

 Four P's, Four C's And The Consumer Revolution

Marketing techniques